Giovanni Martino Cesare (c. 1590 in Udine – 6 February 1667 in Munich) was a composer and cornett player.

By 1611 (his first publication) he resided as cornetto player at the house of Charles, Margrave of Burgau (died 1618) at Günzburg, near Augsburg. In 1615 he became an employee of Duke Maximilian of Bavaria (Munich) as a cornettist, where he wrote his best known collection Musicali melodie (1621). It contains fourteen instrumental canzonas of one to six parts with continuo, and fourteen motets.

Sources

Grove Music

Cornett players
17th-century Italian composers
Italian male composers
1590s births
1667 deaths
Year of birth uncertain
People from Udine
17th-century male musicians
Emigrants from the Republic of Venice to the Holy Roman Empire